Jake Dennis (born 16 June 1995) is a British racing driver who lives in Nuneaton, Warwickshire. He currently competes in the Formula E with Avalanche Andretti Formula E.

Early career

Karting
Dennis began his racing career in karting at the age of eight with Andy Cox Racing. In 2005 he clinched South West Cadet championship title. Following year he finished third in the Shenington Club Championship. In 2008 he received Racing Steps Foundation backing and graduated to KF3 category.  in his first year he became British champion in KF3. By 2010 he claimed MSA Super 1 British Junior Championship and the CIK-FIA U18 World Championship.

InterSteps & Formula Renault
In 2011 Dennis made his début in single-seaters taking part in the new-for-2011 InterSteps championship for Fortec Motorsport, dominated in the championship and won the title with eight wins. Also he raced for Fortec in off-season Formula Renault UK Finals Series, finishing 19th in the standings with just three point-scoring finishes.

Dennis continued his collaboration with Fortec for Formula Renault 2.0 NEC (initially in British Formula Renault Championship but  the championship was closed due to lack of entries) and Eurocup Formula Renault 2.0.

Dennis was nominated for the McLaren Autosport BRDC Award due to his performances in the Formula Renault 2.0 NEC series, Jake then went on to win the prestigious award, and became the youngest ever participant at only 17 years of age.

In 2014 he joined Carlin Motorsport to compete in the FIA European Formula 3 Championship, where he collected multiple podiums.

GP3 Series
In December 2015, it was announced that Dennis would compete in the 2016 GP3 Series with Arden International. He finished fourth in the drivers standings, having taken a pair of victories.

Formula E

Avalanche Andretti Formula E (2021–)

2020–21 season 
Dennis debuted in the 2020–21 Formula E World Championship driving for the BMW i Andretti team alongside Maximilian Günther. With 0 points from the first 4 races, he took his first win during the second race of the 2021 Valencia ePrix, held at the Circuit Ricardo Tormo, and a second win in the first race round the Excel arena in London. After a red flag in the final race of the season in Berlin which saw 2 title contenders eliminated on the start line. The provisinal standings meant Jake Dennis and Nyck De Vries would be tied on 95 points if the race finished as it was, however in the restart Dennis went for an overtake and crashed, meaning he would score 0 points, and not win the championship in his rookie season.

Dennis finished the season with four retirements and ended up third in the standings with 91 points, placing as the highest rookie.

2021–22 season 
Dennis remained with Andretti Autosport despite BMW withdrawing from the team. He was partnered by Oliver Askew.
Dennis took 3rd in the opening race and 5th the next day giving him 25 points after 2 races. He then took 1 point from the next 3 races with a DNF in the second race in Rome, and then 2 points from the next 3, with a total of 28 points from 8 races. with a 6th, 7th, 10th and 8th following up. Dennis then had 47 points from 12 races heading to his home race in London.

Dennis topped the fp2 times in London and took the pace into Qualifying to secure pole and 3 points, Dennis won round 13 leading the race from championship leader Stoffel Vandoorne, and also took the fastest lap, giving him the maximum 29 points on Saturday. Dennis took pole again on Sunday but fought with Di Grassi for the win and ended the race in 2nd with the fastest lap. The strong weekend meant he climbed up the championship table gaining 51 points in 2 races. Dennis finished 4th with a fastest lap and 3rd in Seoul to finish the season in 6th with 126 points, joint on points with Di Grassi but behind due to countback, and Di Grassi having 1 4th place and Dennis having no 4th places.

2022–23 season 
Dennis extended his contract to remain with Andretti for the 2022–23 season and beyond. At the season opener in Mexico City, Dennis managed to qualify second despite damaging his front wing during the quarter final session, which he was unable to change due to Parc fermé regulations. He used his position to overtake poleman Lucas di Grassi in the opening stage of the race, after which the Briton created a gap, taking victory with a margin of eight second and becoming the first winner of the Gen3 era. His title charge continued in Diriyah, as, having started from the sixth row of the grid, Dennis charged through to finish second, narrowly missing out on victory to Pascal Wehrlein, an end result that repeated itself the following day. At the Hyderabad ePrix, Dennis would miss out on the points for the first time that year, being the victim of an error from René Rast, who collided with the back of the Andretti driver in the closing stages of the race. Misery would pile on in Cape Town, where, having been given a drive-through penalty for under-pressured tyres, the Briton ended up 13th.

IndyCar 
Following his season in Formula E in 2022 for the Avalanche Andretti team, he tested one of the team's cars in October 2022 in a private IndyCar driver evaluation test at Sebring.

Formula One
In , Dennis was the simulator and development driver for Red Bull Racing. As a result of the team's association with Aston Martin, he tested for them at the Barcelona mid-season tests in May 2018, and then again at the Hungaroring in August.

Racing record

Career summary

† As Dennis was a guest driver, he was ineligible to score points.
* Season still in progress.

Complete Eurocup Formula Renault 2.0 results 
(key) (Races in bold indicate pole position) (Races in italics indicate fastest lap)

Complete FIA Formula 3 European Championship results
(key) (Races in bold indicate pole position) (Races in italics indicate fastest lap)

† Driver did not finish the race, but was classified as he completed over 90% of the race distance.

Complete GP3 Series results
(key) (Races in bold indicate pole position) (Races in italics indicate fastest lap)

Complete FIA World Endurance Championship results
(key) (Races in bold indicate pole position; races in
italics indicate fastest lap)

24 Hours of Le Mans results

Complete Blancpain GT Series Sprint Cup results

Complete Deutsche Tourenwagen Masters results

Complete Formula E results 
(key) (Races in bold indicate pole position; races in italics indicate fastest lap)

* Season still in progress.

References

External links

Profile on Racing Steps Foundation site

Living people
1995 births
English racing drivers
People from Nuneaton
Formula Renault Eurocup drivers
Formula Renault 2.0 NEC drivers
British Formula Renault 2.0 drivers
FIA Institute Young Driver Excellence Academy drivers
FIA Formula 3 European Championship drivers
MRF Challenge Formula 2000 Championship drivers
Formula E drivers
Carlin racing drivers
Prema Powerteam drivers
Arden International drivers
Andretti Autosport drivers
Karting World Championship drivers